Elenchus koebelei is an insect species in the genus Elenchus. It is a parasitoid of Prokelisia, found in Florida salt marshes.

References

External links

Strepsiptera
Insects described in 1908